Lady Godiva is a 1911 American silent historical drama film directed by J. Stuart Blackton and produced by Vitagraph Studios in Brooklyn, New York. Its scenario is based on a legendary incident in the life of Godiva, Countess of Mercia, who lived in England during the mid-11th century. Allegedly, the Anglo-Saxon noblewoman rode naked—covered only by her long hair—through the streets of Coventry to protest and abolish an oppressive tax imposed on that town's residents by her husband, Leofric, Earl of Mercia. The film, copies of which survive today, stars Julia Swayne Gordon in the title role with a supporting cast including Robert Maillard, Harold Wilson, and Kate Price.

Plot
It is the year 1040 in the town of Coventry, England. The local lord, Leofric, has imposed a heavy tax on the residents, many of whom are on the verge of starvation. They appeal for help from the caring noblewoman Lady Godiva, who is the wife of Leofric. On the people's behalf, she pleads with her husband to revoke the tax and relieve their suffering. Leofric, who quickly grows weary of her pleas, decides to test his wife's sincerity and her resolve by promising to rescind the tax if she will ride naked on horseback through the streets of the town. Godiva accepts the condition despite the prospect of such a public humiliation.

Before riding through Coventry, the lady instructs her attendants to post in town a proclamation in which she expresses her love for the people and to end the tax for them she explains, "To save you, I must ride thro' the town unclothed". Her proclamation also asks all residents to support her by remaining "within your homes two hours at mid day", shutting all doors and windows, and adding "Let no eye look out." At the appointed time, Lady Godiva slowly rides through the streets, with only her long hair, extending from her head "to her knee", partially covering her bare body. All the townspeople but one dutifully follow their lady's instructions to stay indoors and to avoid observing her as she passes. Only the town's lecherous tailor, Thomas, cannot resist the temptation to see Godiva fully unclothed. Cutting a small hole into a closed shutter at his house, he peeks at her riding by and is instantly struck blind. Forever after known as "Peeping Tom", the tailor for his transgression suffers divine retribution, resulting in his eyes being "shrivell'd into darkness in his head". Lady Godiva, her task now done, returns home, where her husband honors their agreement and promptly announces to a cheering crowd that he is repealing the hated tax.

Cast

Julia Swayne Gordon as Lady Godiva
Robert Maillard as Leofric, Earl of Mercia
Harold Wilson as "Peeping Tom"
Kate Price as Lady Godiva's attendant
Clara Kimball Young as Coventry resident praying
Alfred Hollingsworth as Coventry resident
James Young as Coventry resident
Harry Ward as Coventry resident 
Stanley Dunn as Coventry resident

Production

The film was produced in New York City at Vitagraph's plant and "studio yard" located near the intersection of East 15th Street and Locust Avenue in the Midwood neighborhood of Brooklyn. The medieval legend of Lady Godiva, which is the basis of the film, has been cited in historical accounts as early as 1307, more than 250 years after the noblewoman made her famous ride. That event also inspired numerous poetical works over the centuries, including "Godiva" written by British poet Alfred, Lord Tennyson in 1840. Wording in the film's intertitles shows that Vitagraph's version of the legend is clearly adapted from Tennyson's work and even includes terminology and phrasing drawn verbatim from his poem. The film's lead intertitle, for example, states, "'Godiva, wife of that grim Earl, loved the people well And loathed to see them taxed.'" Tennyson's poem refers to "that grim Earl" with "And loathed to see them overtaxe'd". The rest of Vitagraph's intertitles are laced with additional wording from Tennyson, such as "She told him of their tears, And pray'd him", "from a heart as rough as Esau's hand", and "'Ride you naked thro' the town, And I repeal [the tax]'".

As early as mid-July 1911—three months before the film's actual release, the New York-based trade journal The Moving Picture World reported Vitagraph's plans to produce Lady Godiva and predicted it would be a success:

Promotion in 1911 of "the most famous bareback ride in history" relied on the most sensational aspect of the Godiva story: nudity.  If, however, some theatergoers hoped to get a glimpse of a nude or even partially clad Julia Swayne Gordon, they were no doubt disappointed. Scenes during the filming of Lady Godiva were carefully choreographed to minimize any screen perspectives that would allow a full and open viewing of Godiva riding through Coventry; and, in any case, Gordon was never nude during her performance; she wore a full neck-to-foot body stocking, one known in the entertainment trade as a "living-picture suit". At the end of the ride, however, Godiva is filmed from behind as she dismounts, giving one momentary view of her bare back, buttocks, and legs.

Release and reception

Vitagraph's decision to release the film in late October may have been linked to an anticipated increase in the public's interest in the historical character Lady Godiva, an interest connected to media coverage of a stage adaptation of her story that would open on Broadway in November 1911. That play, written and directed by British dramatist Louis N. Parker, starred the popular American stage actress Viola Allen and was scheduled to tour the United States for months after its New York premiere.

In both critical reviews and at the box office, the film proved to be successful during the final quarter of 1911. In its November 4 issue, the trade publication The Moving Picture World describes the production as artful in its interpretation of Tennyson's work and emotionally effective in its spiritual tone:

The film continued to be popular and successful in drawing large audiences. Three weeks after the production's release, the motion-picture reviewer for The Moving Picture News reported that Lady Godiva "drew a packed house at the Lyceum [Theatre]" in Cleveland, Ohio.

Surviving copies of the film
Numerous digitized copies of this film survive, although it is unverified whether any of these extant copies represent the full theatrical cut released by Vitagraph in October 1911. Some copies of Lady Godiva are available on the video-streaming service YouTube, all of which are in the public domain.

Notes

References

External links

Stills at moviessilently.com

1911 films
1910s historical drama films
American historical drama films
American black-and-white films
American silent feature films
Films directed by J. Stuart Blackton
Films set in England
Films set in Coventry
Films set in the 11th century
Films shot in New York City
Lady Godiva
Films based on works by Alfred, Lord Tennyson
Surviving American silent films
1910s American films
Silent American drama films